The 2021–22 Hyderabad FC season is the club's third competitive season since its inception in 2019. The season covered from 1 June 2021 to 31 May 2022.

Kits

Management team

Players
Players and squad numbers last updated on 20 March 2022. Appearances include all competitions.Note: Flags indicate national team as has been defined under FIFA eligibility rules. Players may hold more than one non-FIFA nationality.

New contracts

Transfers

In

Out

Loan in

Loan out

Pre-season

Competitions

Durand Cup

Hyderabad FC made their debut in 130th edition of the Durand Cup. Hyderabad were drawn in Group D alongside Assam Rifles, Army Red and Gokulam Kerala.

Group stage

Indian Super League

League stage
The fixtures for the first 10 rounds were announced on 13 September 2021. Hyderabad started their season with a narrow 0-1 loss to the Chennaiyin. They later went on an eight-match unbeaten streak including a 2-2 draw against the ATK Mohun Bagan to climb to the top of the league table for the first time in their history. The fixtures for the later 10 rounds were announced on 21 December 2021. Hyderabad lost to Kerala Blasters in the fight for the top position of league table with the lone goal in the match scored by Álvaro Vázquez for Kerala Blasters. Hyderabad finished third in the league table at halfway-stage.

Hyderabad had a good run of results in their next eight rounds including six wins and once again climbed to the top of the table. They also became first team to qualify for the playoffs with two games to spare after their 2-1 win against the Kerala Blasters. Hyderabad lost to Jamshedpur with many of their first-team players missing the match due to Covid-19. This loss put them out of contention for the league winners' shield. They won their final league match against the defending champions, Mumbai City finishing second in the league stage.

League table

Results by matchday

Matches

Playoffs

The fixtures for the playoff were confirmed on 7 March 2022 with the Hyderabad playing against the ATK Mohun Bagan over the two legs in the semifinals. Hyderabad started slowly in the first leg and went trailing 0-1 with Roy Krishna giving the lead for the ATK Mohun Bagan. Bartholomew Ogbeche equalized just before the half-time for the Hyderabad and the dominant second half saw the Hyderabad winning the match 3-1 with the second-half goals coming from Mohammad Yasir and Javier Siverio. This gave them a two-goal lead going into the second leg. They advanced 3-2 on aggregate despite losing 0-1 in the second leg with Krishna scoring the only goal of the match for ATK Mohun Bagan. This meant that the Hyderabad reached the final for the first-time in their history. 

In the final at Fatorda, Hyderabad tied 1-1 against the Kerala Blasters at the end of the regular time as the match went into extra-time. No goals from the either team in extra-time forced the match to penalty shootout. Laxmikant Kattimani saved three penalties in the shoot-out as Hyderabad defeated Kerala Blasters 3-1 on penalties to lift the ISL trophy for the first-time. Halicharan Narzary scored the winning penalty for the Hyderabad while Kattimani was adjudged hero of the match for his saves in the shootout.

Semi-finals

Final

Player statistics

Appearances and goals

Top scorers

Top assists

Clean sheets

Discipline

Summary

Awards

Players

Manager

References

Hyderabad FC seasons
Hyderabad FC